The 7th Mountain Division was formed through the redesignation of 99th Light Infantry Division, which had fought on the southern sector of the Eastern Front until being withdrawn to Germany in October 1941. In 1942, it was sent to Finland and remained there until the Finnish withdrawal from the war. The Division retreated into Norway where it remained until the end of the War.

Commanders
 General der Gebirgstruppe Rudolf Konrad   (1 November 1941 – 19 December 1941)
 Generalmajor Wilhelm Weiß   (19 December 1941 – 1 January 1942)
 General der Artillerie Robert Martinek   (1 January 1942 – 1 May 1942)
 Generalleutnant August Krakau   (1 May 1942 – 22 July 1942)
 General der Artillerie Robert Martinek   (22 July 1942 – 10 September 1942)
 Generalleutnant August Krakau   (10 September 1942 – 8 May 1945)

Order of battle
 206. Gebirgsjäger Regiment
 1. Battalion
 2. Battalion
 3. Battalion
 Mountain Panzerjäger Company (mot)
 218. Gebirgsjäger Regiment
 1. Battalion
 2. Battalion
 3. Battalion
 Mountain Panzerjäger Company (mot)
 99. Panzerjäger Battalion
 99. Reconnaissance Battalion
 79. Mountain Artillery Regiment
 1. Battalion
 2. Battalion
 3. Battalion
 4. Battalion
 99. Mountain Pioneer Battalion
 99. Mountain Signals Battalion
 54. Mountain Feldersatz Battalion
 54. Ski Battalion
 99. Supply Troops

Finnish auxiliaries
In spring of 1944, the Division controlled several Finnish units that supported it. These were:
 Frontier Battalions 7 and 8
 Independent Battalions 8 and 11
 Mortar Company 11
 Gun Company 48
 Light Artillery Battalion 17
 Independent Armoured Car Platoons 7 and 9

References

Further reading
 James Lucas - Hitler's Mountain Troops: Fighting at the extremes
 Gordon Williamson - German Mountain & Ski Troops 1939-45
 Roland Kaltenegger - Schicksalsweg und Kampf der 'Bergschuh'-Division: Die Kriegschronik der 7. Gebirgs-Division vormals 99. leichte Infanterie-Division (in German)
 Emil Schuler - Mit dem Bergschuh in Rußland und Finnland: Kriegserlebnisse und Kriegserfahrungen der 7. Gebirgs Division, vormals 99. leichte Infanterie Division (in German)
Dominic Balcom - Survival From The Mountains Troops

7
7
Military units and formations established in 1941
Military units and formations disestablished in 1945